The Aberdare Mountains African mole-rat (Tachyoryctes audax) is a species of rodent in the family Spalacidae endemic to Kenya.  Its natural habitats are subtropical or tropical moist montane forests and subtropical or tropical high-altitude grassland. Some taxonomic authorities consider it to be conspecific with the East African mole-rat.

References

Mammals of Kenya
Tachyoryctes
Endemic fauna of Kenya
Mammals described in 1910
Taxa named by Oldfield Thomas
Taxonomy articles created by Polbot
Taxobox binomials not recognized by IUCN